The Party for the Commonwealth of Canada (PCC) ran 66 candidates in the 1984 federal election, none of whom were elected.  Information about these candidates may be found here.  The PCC was the political wing of Lyndon LaRouche's movement in Canada.

Quebec

Richelieu: Yves Julien
Yves Julien listed himself as a student.  He received 76 votes (0.16%), finishing seventh against Progressive Conservative candidate Louis Plamondon.

Ontario

Hamilton East: Ken Perry

Perry listed himself as an electrician.  He had previously campaigned in a provincial by-election in 1979 as the candidate of another Larouchite organization, the North American Labour Party (Toronto Star, 5 April 1979).  The NALP was not a registered party, and Perry's political affiliation did not appear on the ballot.

References